Tatsiana Uladzimirauna Khaladovich (Łacinka: Tacciana Chaładovič; born 21 June 1991) is a Belarusian track and field athlete who competes in the javelin throw. She won gold at the 2016 European Championships, where she set a personal best and Belarusian record of 66.34 m.

Career
Khaladovich finished fifth at the 2014 European Championships in Zurich. She won the gold medal at the 2015 Summer Universiade in Gwangju. At the 2016 European Championships in Amsterdam, she won the gold medal with a personal best, 66.34 metres. She placed fifth at the 2016 Summer Olympics in Rio de Janeiro.

In 2019, she won the silver medal in the team event at the 2019 European Games held in Minsk, Belarus.

Competition record

References

1991 births
Living people
Belarusian female javelin throwers
World Athletics Championships athletes for Belarus
European Athletics Championships medalists
Athletes (track and field) at the 2016 Summer Olympics
Athletes (track and field) at the 2020 Summer Olympics
Olympic athletes of Belarus
Universiade medalists in athletics (track and field)
Universiade gold medalists for Belarus
Athletes (track and field) at the 2019 European Games
European Games medalists in athletics
European Games gold medalists for Belarus
European Games silver medalists for Belarus
Diamond League winners
Medalists at the 2015 Summer Universiade
Sportspeople from Pinsk